Romance is a short animated film, directed by Georges Schwizgebel and released in 2011.

A co-production of the National Film Board of Canada, Radio Télévision Suisse and Schwizgebel's own Studio GDS, the film won the Genie Award for Best Animated Short at the 32nd Genie Awards.

Plot summary

Cast

References

External links
 Romance at the National Film Board of Canada
 

2011 films
Canadian animated short films
Swiss animated short films
National Film Board of Canada animated short films
Best Animated Short Film Genie and Canadian Screen Award winners
2010s Canadian films